The Battle of Adibo was a German military campaign in 1896 against the Dagbamba of West Africa in Adibo, now in present-day Ghana. Following their resistance against foreign authority, the Dagbamba tribesmen met and launched an attack on the heavily armed German Schutztruppe and Askari paramilitary police accompanying the Lieutenant Valentin von Massow on his way to their capital at the village of Adibo, who had been sent by the German colonial administration to quell the rebellion. The Dagbamba fighters suffered significant losses on the second day of the battle and yielded after their capital Yendi was razed to the ground on December 4, 1896. Defeat of the Dagbamba enabled the German Empire to complete establishing the Togoland protectorate, which encompassed the eastern part of the Kingdom of Dagbon. The western part of the Kingdom was released to the British and incorporated into the British Empire.

Written accounts of the incursion primarily come from the personal letters and diaries of von Massow to his mother, as well as his official reports addressed to the Governor of Lome under the colonial department of the Ministry of Foreign Affairs in Berlin. Dagbaŋ drummer storytellers maintain a slightly different oral account of the event.

Background
Before 1850, German missionaries had become well-established among the southern tribes of present-day Ghana and Togo, but Germany first established a formal protectorate along the coast of West Africa on July 5, 1884. They continued their advance northwards and from 1884 established the Togoland protectorate as a discontinuous part of the Deutsch-Westafrika protectorate that included Cameroon.

Their advance was influenced by the need to expand agricultural plantations, road and railway lines; and to exact forced labour for those purposes. Factors that facilitated their movement into the hinterlands included the construction of a port at Lomé, installation of the Kamina Funkstation radio communications transmitter, and the minimal resistance posed by the tribes they encountered such as the Ewe people, who mostly settled as fragmented clans.

By 1890, the German expeditions had ventured into the savanna regions of present-day Ghana and Togo, where they encountered the more formidable Dagbamba warriors.

References

African resistance to colonialism
Wars involving Ghana
History of Ghana